The IQFoil European Championships are international sailing regattas in the IQFoil class.

Editions

Medalists

Men

Women

References

European championships in sailing
Recurring sporting events established in 2020